Alfred Joseph Parent (November 11, 1875 – November 2, 1972 was an professional baseball player. He played all or part of eleven seasons in Major League Baseball (MLB), between 1899 and 1911, for the St. Louis Perfectos, Boston Americans and Chicago White Sox, primarily as a shortstop. Parent batted and threw right-handed. He was born in Biddeford, Maine.

Twice he hit .300, including a career-high .306 in 1901, and led the American League in at bats in 1902. He broke up three no-hit bids, as he got his club's only hits in these games. At shortstop, defensive play saved Cy Young's perfect game. He also was a member of the Boston team who clinched in 1903 the first World Championship in major league history.

In a 12-season career, Parent was a .262 hitter (1306-for-4984) with 20 home runs and 471 RBI in 1327 games, including 180 doubles, 74 triples, 633 runs and 184 stolen bases. In the 1903 World Series, he hit .281 (9-32) with eight runs and four RBI.

Parent was traded to the Baltimore Orioles in 1911 after a pay dispute with Charles Comiskey.  In 1914 Baltimore signed Babe Ruth.  Parent coached Ruth more than anybody else at the time.  Due to low attendance owner Dunn began to sell players.  He visited the Red Sox and closed the sale of Ruth with help of Parent who was trusted by player-manager Bill Carrigan.

In the fall of 1960, Parent appeared on the television program I've Got A Secret alongside Pittsburgh Pirate Tommy Leach, as a commemoration of participating in the first World Series in 1903.

Parent died in Sanford, Maine, at the age of 96. At the time of his death, he was the last surviving participant of the inaugural 1903 World Series.

See also
List of Major League Baseball career stolen bases leaders

References

External links

The Deadball Era

Major League Baseball shortstops
St. Louis Perfectos players
Boston Americans players
Chicago White Sox players
Portland (minor league baseball) players
New Haven Blues players
Providence Clamdiggers (baseball) players
Providence Grays (minor league) players
Baltimore Orioles (IL) players
Toronto Maple Leafs (International League) players
Springfield Ponies players
Minor league baseball managers
Baseball players from Maine
19th-century baseball players
Sportspeople from Biddeford, Maine
People from Sanford, Maine
1875 births
1972 deaths